Old Tavern is an unincorporated community in Fauquier County, in the U.S. state of Virginia.

References

Unincorporated communities in Virginia
Unincorporated communities in Fauquier County, Virginia